is a multiplatform business simulation video game that turns the player into a highly respected corporate title holder.

Gameplay

Using the management abilities provided by the game, players must turn their fledgling  into a profitable super corporation. Created by Koei, the game was geared towards Japanese business students in high school, college, and university while also attempting to appeal to casual gamers who have an interest in learning how a Japanese corporation is operated.

Literacy in the Japanese language is required in addition to advanced arthimetic skills. Top Management features abstract art that serves as the game's graphics. A general business meeting is always held on the beginning of April as a measure to set things like employment levels, executive salaries, and financial benefits for the employees. Meetings held every other month focus on spreading advertisement throughout Japan, improving the performance of the products, and determining how many products to manufacture for sale on the open market.

The game is mostly text-based and players can choose between five major electronics companies to play as (IBN, Pujitsu, Tochiba, Charp and NEG, parodying IBM, Fujitsu, Toshiba, Sharp, and NEC). Like most business games, bankruptcy results in a game over. The NEC PC-9801 version was sold primarily as a research guide into the Japanese business world, with the ability to purchase licenses for up to 10 students and a teacher's version.

Sequel
A sequel named Top Management II was later released for the Super Famicom in addition to the Windows operating system and for the NEC PC-9801. The game was essentially the same type of gameplay except with enhanced graphics.

References

1990 video games
Business simulation games
Japan-exclusive video games
Koei games
Koei Tecmo franchises
NEC PC-9801 games
Nintendo Entertainment System games
Video games developed in Japan
Video games set in Japan
Multiplayer and single-player video games